Lagenoderus is a genus of leaf-rolling weevil that is noted for being strongly sexually dimorphic. Species of this genus are all known from Madagascar. Females of Lagenoderus had been assigned to a different genus, Phymatolabus Jekel, owing to confusion due to the species' sexually dimorphic nature.

References 

 

Attelabidae